Nylars is a village in the southwest of the Danish island of Bornholm, 8 km east of Rønne and 8 km west of Aakirkeby. In January 2022 it had a population of 220. It is best known for Nylars Church, the island's second largest round church. The village developed at the beginning of the 20th century as a result of the railway line from Rønne to Nexø. It is located between the discontinued railway to the north and the main road from Rønne to Aarkirkeby to the south.

References

Cities and towns in the Capital Region of Denmark
Bornholm